Sydaphera lactea is a species of sea snail, a marine gastropod mollusk in the family Cancellariidae, the nutmeg snails.

Description

Distribution

References

 Deshayes, G. P., 1830 Histoire naturelle des vers. In: Encyclopédie méthodique, vol. 2(1), p. 1-256
 Hemmen, J. (2007). Recent Cancellariidae. Annotated and illustrated catalogue of Recent Cancellariidae. Privately published, Wiesbaden. 428 pp

External links
 Sowerby, G. B. I. (1832-1833). Cancellaria. In: The Conchological Illustrations. London. Parts 9–13. 5 pls with explanations

Cancellariidae
Gastropods described in 1830